Waimakariri District Council is the territorial authority for the Waimakariri District of New Zealand.

The council has 11 members: the mayor of Waimakariri, and ten ward councillors.

Composition

Councillors

 Mayor 
 Kaiapoi-Woodend Ward: Deputy Mayor Neville Atkinson, Al Blackie, Philip Redmond, Sandra Stewart
 Oxford-Ohoka Ward: Wendy Doody, Niki Mealings
 Rangiora-Ashley: Kirstyn Barnett, Robbie Brine, Joan Ward, Paul Williams

Community boards

 Rangiora-Ashley Community Board
 Oxford-Ohoka Community Board
 Woodend-Sefton Community Board
 Kaiapoi-Tuahiwi Community Board

History

The council was formed in 1989, replacing Eyre County Council (1912-1989) and Kaiapoi County Council (1868-1989).

In 2020, the council had 433 staff, including 63 earning more than $100,000. According to the Taxpayers' Union think tank, residential rates averaged $2,648.

References

External links

 Official website

Waimakariri District
Politics of Canterbury, New Zealand
Territorial authorities of New Zealand